Somalia–United States relations are bilateral relations between the Federal Republic of Somalia and the United States of America. Somalia has an embassy in Washington, D.C., and the United States maintains an embassy in Mogadishu which was reopened in late 2019.

History
Somalia had historic relations with the United States under the Geledi Sultanate. In 1776, the Geledi Sultanate was the first independent state in Africa to recognise the United States, and diplomatic relations were established in 1777 with the Geledi sharing naval intelligence with the American naval forces. In 1897, the Geledi Sultanate sent a high-profile delegation to New York under their foreign minister Khalid Aden Mohammed and signed the Indian Ocean Naval Treaty to combat Zanzibar slave trading.

During the late 1970s and early 1980s, Somalia's then socialist government abandoned alliances with its former partner the Soviet Union due to fallout over the Ogaden War. Because the Soviet Union had close relations with both the Somali government and Ethiopia's then new communist Dergue regime, they were forced to choose one side to commit to. The Soviet shift in support to Ethiopia motivated the Siad Barre government to seek allies elsewhere. It eventually settled on the Soviet Unions' Cold War rival, the United States. The US had been courting the Somali government for some time on account of Somalia's strategic position at the mouth of the Bab el Mandeb gateway to the Red Sea and the Suez Canal. Somalia's initial friendship with the Soviet Union and later military support by the United States enabled it to build the largest army on the continent.

After the collapse of the Barre government and the start of the Somali Civil War in the early 1990s, the United States embassy in Mogadishu was evacuated and closed down. However, the American government never formally severed diplomatic ties with Somalia, leading the UN-sanctioned multinational Unified Task Force (UNITAF) in southern Somalia. Following the establishment of the Transitional Federal Government (TFG) in 2004, the U.S. also acknowledged and supported the internationally recognized TFG as the country's national governing body. It likewise engaged Somalia's regional administrations, such as Puntland and Somaliland, to ensure broad-based inclusion in the peace process.

The Federal Government of Somalia was established on August 20, 2012, concurrent with the end of the TFG's interim mandate. It represents the first permanent central government in the country since the start of the civil war. On September 10, 2012, the new Federal Parliament also elected Hassan Sheikh Mohamud as the incumbent President of Somalia. The election was welcomed by the U.S. authorities, who re-affirmed United States' continued support for Somalia's government, its territorial integrity and sovereignty.

In January 2013, the U.S. announced that it was set to exchange diplomatic notes with the new central government of Somalia, re-establishing official ties with the country for the first time in 20 years. According to the Department of State, the decision was made in recognition of the significant progress that the Somali authorities had achieved on both the political and war fronts. The move is expected to grant the Somali government access to new sources of development funds from American agencies as well as international bodies like the International Monetary Fund and World Bank, thereby facilitating the ongoing reconstruction process.

At the behest of the Somali and American federal governments, among other international actors, the United Nations Security Council unanimously approved United Nations Security Council Resolution 2093 during its 6 March 2013 meeting to suspend the 21-year arms embargo on Somalia. The endorsement officially lifts the purchase ban on light weapons for a provisional period of one year, but retains certain restrictions on the procurement of heavy arms such as surface-to-air missiles, howitzers and cannons. On April 9, 2013, the U.S. government likewise approved the provision of defense articles and services by the American authorities to the Somali Federal Government. At the request of the Somali authorities and AMISOM, the U.S. military in late 2013 also established a small team of advisers in Mogadishu to provide consultative and planning support to the allied forces.

On 5 May 2015, President of Somalia Hassan Sheikh Mohamud, Prime Minister Omar Abdirashid Ali Sharmarke, and other senior Somali government officials met with US Secretary of State John Kerry in Mogadishu. The bilateral meeting was the first ever visit to Somalia by an incumbent US Secretary of State. It served as a symbol of the ameliorated political and security situation in the country. The officials focused on the benchmarks enshrined within Somalia's Vision 2016 political roadmap, as well as cooperation in the security sector.

In January 2017 after President Donald Trump took office, Somali citizens were temporarily banned from entering the United States by the executive order "Protecting the Nation From Foreign Terrorist Entry Into the United States." This also includes Somali refugees who are willing to resettle in the United States through the US refugee admissions program.

After the election of Somali-American dual citizen Mohamed Abdullahi Mohamed as the next Somali President, US Secretary Of State Rex Tillerson congratulated the president-elect and is looking forward to strengthen the relationship between Somalia and the United States and that the recent elections marks an important milestone in Somalia's ongoing transition to peace, stability, and prosperity.

Trade and partnerships
The United States has continued to be one of the main suppliers of armaments to the Somali National Army (SNA). In June 2009, the reconstituted SNA received 40 tonnes worth of arms and ammunition from the U.S. government to assist it in combating the Islamist insurgency within southern Somalia. The U.S. administration also pledged more military equipment and material resources to help the Somali authorities firm up on general security.

Additionally, the two countries engage in minor trade and investment. The United States exports legumes, grain baking-related commodities, donated products and machinery to Somalia. Somalia in turn exports precious stones and low-value shipments to the United States.

Diplomatic missions
Somalia maintains an embassy in Washington, D.C. Between July and December 2014, the diplomatic mission was led by Omar Abdirashid Ali Sharmarke, who served as Somalia's first Ambassador to the United States since 1991. As of April 2015, Fatuma Abdullahi Insaniya is the Ambassador of Somalia to the United States. The Somaliland region also has a Liaison Office in Washington, D.C.

The US opened a Consulate-General in Mogadishu in 1957, the capital of the Trust Territory of Somaliland, a UN trusteeship under Italian administration. The consulate was upgraded to embassy status in July 1960, when the US recognized Somalia's independence and appointed an ambassador. It later closed down in January 1991, following the start of the civil war. The US also operated a consulate in Hargeisa in northwestern Somalia in the 1960s. In June 2014, in what she described as a gesture of the deepening relations between Washington and Mogadishu and faith in Somalia's stabilization efforts, U.S. Undersecretary of State Wendy Sherman announced that the United States would reopen its diplomatic mission in Mogadishu at an unspecified future date. In February 2015, U.S. President Barack Obama nominated Foreign Service veteran Katherine Simonds Dhanani to become the new Ambassador of the United States to Somalia. Dhanani later withdrew her nomination in May of the year, citing personal reasons.

In May 2015, in recognition of the sociopolitical progress made in Somalia and its return to effective governance, US Secretary of State John Kerry announced a preliminary plan to reestablish the US embassy in Mogadishu. He indicated that although there was no set timetable for the premises' relaunch, the US government had immediately begun upgrading its diplomatic representation in the country. President of Somalia Hassan Sheikh Mohamud and Prime Minister Omar Abdirashid Ali Sharmarke also presented to Kerry the real estate deed for land reserved for the new US embassy compound. In November 2015, Somalia re-opened its embassy in Washington, DC.

In December 2018, the United States reopened a "permanent diplomatic presence" in Mogadishu. The new mission will not be a full embassy and some diplomatic staff are expected to remain at the US Embassy in Nairobi, Kenya where the US Mission to Somalia is based. The current US Ambassador to Somalia is Larry Andre Jr.

See also

 Embassy of the United States, Mogadishu
 Foreign relations of Somalia
 Foreign relations of the United States
 United States Ambassador to Somalia
 Somaliland–United States relations

References

Further reading
 Henriksen, Thomas H. Clinton's Foreign Policy in Somalia, Bosnia, Haiti, and North Korea (Hoover Press, 1996).

External links
History of Somalia - U.S. relations
United States Virtual Presence Post Somalia
 Somali - U.S. Relations from the Dean Peter Krogh Foreign Affairs Digital Archives

 
Bilateral relations of the United States
United States